Mid Express Tchad was a cargo airline based in N'Djamena, Chad. It was established as AMW Tchad in 2007 and rebranded Mid-Express Tchad the following year.

Fleet
The Mid-Express Tchad fleet included the following aircraft (as of 4 July 2009):

1 Boeing 707-300 (stored)

References

Defunct airlines of Chad
Cargo airlines